Saar-Pfalz Braves was a German professional basketball club based in Saar-Pfalz. Due to financial problems, the club was dissolved in June 2012.

Notable players

 Maik Zirbes
 Travis Reed

References

Defunct basketball teams in Germany
Basketball teams established in 1950
Basketball teams disestablished in 2012